Huaridelphis is an extinct genus of river dolphins from the Early Miocene (Deseadan to Friasian in the SALMA classification). The type species is H. raimondii, found in the Chilcatay Formation of the Pisco Basin.

Etymology 
The genus name is derived from the name of the Huari people, an ancient culture from Peru, and from the Latin word for "dolphin"; delphis. The specific name was chosen in honor of Antonio Raimondi, an Italian geographer and the first person to discover fossilized whale remains in Peru.

Description 
The rostrum, which was only slightly dorsoventrally flattened, and made up only 67% of the condylobasal length, considerably less than most squalodelphinids. The antorbital notches were V-shaped and asymmetrical, with the right notch farther back on the head than the left one.

Discovery 
Fossils of H. raimondii have been recovered from the Chilcatay Formation in Ullujaya and Zamaca, in the Ica Region of Peru.

Habitat 
The specimens date from the Early Miocene. Specimens were found along with fossils of Isurus desori and Carcharocles chubutensis (two species of sharks), as well as those of baleen whales, Teleostei, and sea turtles. Injuries, probably from sharks, were observed on at least two of the fossils.

References 

River dolphins
Prehistoric toothed whales
Miocene cetaceans
Miocene mammals of South America
Friasian
Santacrucian
Colhuehuapian
Deseadan
Neogene Peru
Fossils of Peru
Fossil taxa described in 2014